Michigan Radio is a network of five FM public radio stations operated by the University of Michigan through its broadcasting arm, Michigan Public Media. The network is a founding member of National Public Radio and an affiliate of Public Radio International, American Public Media, and BBC World Service. Its main studio is located in Ann Arbor, with satellite studios in Flint and offices in Grand Rapids. It currently airs news and talk, which it has since July 1, 1996. The combined footprint of the five stations covers most of the southern Lower Peninsula of Michigan, from Muskegon to Detroit.

Stations

WUOM

WUOM (91.7 FM) in Ann Arbor is the flagship station of Michigan Radio, broadcasting with a 93,000 watt transmitter from a  tower near Pinckney. The University of Michigan applied to the FCC on September 11, 1944, for a station at 43.1 FM (part of a band of frequencies used for testing of Frequency Modulation) with a power of 50,000 watts. At the time an assignment on the new FM band was seen as a significant disadvantage.

The FCC granted a license for WUOM (for University of Michigan) at 91.7 in the brand new FM band; the station went on the air on July 5, 1948. Classical music made up a large chunk of the station's broadcast day until the late 1990s, when, faced with declining ratings and listener pledges, Michigan Radio changed its daytime programming to news and talk.  Classical music programming continued for a time at night and was eventually phased out altogether.

WUOM's signal covers most of Southeastern Michigan, including Metro Detroit (where the station has somewhat high ratings for an out-of-market NPR station and competes with Wayne State University's WDET-FM), Lansing and parts of extreme Southwestern Ontario. It is also reported to be the most listened-to station in Ann Arbor, ahead of all commercial signals.  The station provides full-power 24-hour news service to listeners in the state capital. Lansing's main NPR news and talk station, WKAR, must sign off at sundown (with a low-powered translator staying on the air at night) and WKAR-FM airs the Classical 24 network from 7 pm to 5 am weeknights with minimal, if any, interruptions for news.

WFUM

WFUM (91.1 FM), formerly WFUM-FM, licensed to the University of Michigan, is the Flint affiliate of Michigan Radio which began broadcasting on August 23, 1985. It broadcasts with a 17,500 watt transmitter from a  tower near Goodrich.

Until 2009, WFUM was the sister station of PBS affiliate WFUM-TV. The stations shared tower space, even after Central Michigan University (CMU) purchased the latter station in January 2010 and changed its callsign to WCMZ-TV later that year. CMU sold WCMZ-TV in the FCC spectrum auction in February 2017 and it was shut down in April 2018.

WVGR

WVGR (104.1 FM), licensed to the University of Michigan, is the Grand Rapids affiliate of Michigan Radio which began broadcasting on December 7, 1961. For almost 40 years, WVGR blanketed West Michigan with a powerful 108,000-watt signal from an arm on local NBC affiliate WOOD-TV's tower. However, when WOOD-TV needed WVGR's old space for an HD transmitter, WVGR was forced to cut its power to 20,000 watts from space on CBS affiliate WWMT's tower.  It moved to its own tower near Wayland in 2006 and boosted its power to 96,000 watts, largely restoring its original coverage area. It is the only station in the network that directly competes with another NPR member station, namely Grand Valley State University's WGVU-FM.

WVGR is a "grandfathered superpower" Class B, FM station. The maximum power that would be granted today, would be 23,500 watts effective radiated power, using the same antenna height of 221 meters.

WRSX

WRSX (91.3 FM) is the network's Port Huron affiliate. Originally WSGR-FM, it was a college radio station broadcasting an alternative rock and freeform format and licensed to St. Clair County Community College. The station provided an outlet to artists that normally wouldn't be played on commercial stations in the market.  On December 6, 2017, the station signed off the air.

On December 12, 2017, St. Clair County Regional Education Service Agency (RESA) announced it would be assuming control of the station and moving its studios to its Technical Education Center in Marysville, Michigan and join its digital media technology program. The transfer of WSGR-FM's license was consummated on July 9, 2018. On August 17, 2018, RESA changed the station's call sign to WRSX, with all programming supplied from Michigan Radio as a simulcast of Ann Arbor station WUOM 91.7 starting on September 4, 2018.

WLNZ

WLNZ (89.7 FM), licensed to Lansing Community College (LCC), is the network's newest affiliate, serving the state's capital city. After shutting down as an adult album alternative station on March 13, 2020 due to the COVID-19 pandemic, it was resurrected as a Michigan Radio affiliate on November 15, 2021. As part of a partnership between LCC and Michigan Radio, locally-produced programming will continue to air on Saturdays at 1 PM and Sundays at 6 PM.

History

Beginnings
Starting in the 1920s, the University of Michigan Extension Service Bureau of Broadcasting produced programs for other radio stations; for instance, in November 1944, the Bureau of Broadcasting produced "Stump the Professor" for WJR in Detroit and "The Balkan States: Places and Nations in the News" for WKAR in East Lansing. (U of M actually had a short-lived AM station of their own, WCBC, in 1924–25.)

In the early 1940s, the university applied for a new radio station, but was turned down by the Federal Communications Commission (FCC) as there were no available frequencies on the AM band at the time. (WPAG, now WTKA, would become Ann Arbor's first permanent radio station in 1945.) Around this time, U of M began working on plans for a statewide network of four FM stations to be located in Ann Arbor, Mount Pleasant, Manistique and Houghton. The university applied to the FCC on September 11, 1944 for a station at 43.1 FM (part of a band of frequencies used for testing of Frequency Modulation) with a power of 50,000 watts; by 1947, the new station was given the call letters WATX and was assigned to 42.1 FM. (At the time, a station on the new FM band was seen as being at a significant disadvantage.)

The FCC granted a license for WUOM (for University of Michigan) at 91.7 in the brand new FM band; the station went on the air in 1948, broadcasting from studios in Angell Hall on the UM campus. In 1949 the station moved across the street to newly completed studios on the fifth floor of the Administration Building, now known as the Literature, Science & Arts Building. Michigan Radio remained in those studios until August 23, 2003, when it moved off campus to the Argus Building on Ann Arbor's Old West Side.

The university toyed with the idea of opening a TV outlet in the early 1950s: WUOM-TV was assigned a construction permit for Channel 26 in 1953, but never made it to the air. (The following year, the Educational Television and Radio Center (ETRC) moved to Ann Arbor; the ETRC shifted to New York City in 1958 and eventually became National Educational Television, forerunner to the modern Public Broadcasting Service.)

WFUM (for Flint University of Michigan) has been on the air at its current 91.1 frequency since August 23, 1985 when it first signed on as WFUM-FM. The original WFUM operated at 107.1 MHz during the 1950s and was also a simulcast of WUOM. WFUM (FM) was shut down after WUOM increased its power to 115,000 watts, giving it adequate coverage of Flint and meaning that WFUM, which operated with only 400 watts of power, was no longer necessary. WUOM has since reduced its power to 93,000 watts, but still can be heard with a fair signal in Flint. WFUM today operates with 17,500 watts of power.  Its signal reaches the immediate area around Flint primarily but also can be heard in far northern parts of the Detroit metro area on selective radios.  The current incarnation used the "-FM" extension because the WFUM callsign was also assigned to the University of Michigan's television station in Flint when the station first signed on, WFUM (TV). In 2009, the TV station was sold to Central Michigan University and the call letters changed to WCMZ-TV, so WFUM-FM adopted the simplified call letters WFUM.

WVGR (Vogt Grand Rapids, after Fred Vogt, who led the campaign for public radio in the area) has been broadcasting since December 7, 1961.  It covers West Michigan with a powerful 96,000-watt signal.  WVGR had long operated at 108,000 watts from rented space on NBC affiliate WOOD-TV's tower, but had to move in 1999 because WOOD needed the space for its HDTV transmitter.  It temporarily moved to CBS affiliate WWMT's tower while it raised money for a new tower of its own.  WVGR was forced to downgrade to a mono signal at 20,000 watts, but resumed broadcasting from its own tower in the fall of 2006.

Early growth
WUOM quickly established itself as one of the leading educational broadcasters. Because the station was not affiliated with any of the commercial radio networks, it produced nearly all the programs it broadcast in the early days. The program guide for October 1949 shows the station on the air from 12:00pm–10:00pm on weekdays (the station had just expanded into evenings), with a few hours of programs on Saturday and Sunday. The programs listed in the 1949 guide include "From the Classrooms," "Songs of France," "Tell Me, Professor," "Especially for Women," "Around the Town," "Record Rarities," "Hymns of Freedom," "Angell Hall Playhouse," and "Tea-Time Tunes." The station also offered live play-by-play of Michigan football games that month, as well as two live concerts from Hill Auditorium - recitals featuring University of Michigan faculty. Some of the programs featured recorded music, but nearly all programs were performed live to air in the first days. By the early 1950s, many of these shows were being transcribed and sent to other stations.

In the mid 1960s, the station had the largest staff of any FM radio station in the country. WUOM produced programs that were broadcast throughout Michigan on commercial and educational stations, and many of its programs aired around the country. The tapes were "bicycled" from one educational station to another.

In the 1970s and 1980s, WUOM hosted classical music Sunday through Friday, and jazz on Saturday afternoons. Radio plays were sometimes featured as well. Classical music host Peter Greenquist's "Morning Show" of classical music and news is much of the heart of the Ann Arbor community, and sportscaster Tom Hemmingway could be heard across the city on football Saturdays, often telling stories about the history of the game that only such local "townies" would be able to remember. In the 1980s, the station added a nationally syndicated New Age music program, Music from the Hearts of Space, as well as an hour of more eclectic music before the midnight sign-off, featuring the University of Michigan Men's Glee Club.

WUOM's popularity gradually decreased from the height of the 1960s, though it still retained enough prestige to become a charter member of NPR in 1971.  It was one of the approximately 90 stations that aired the inaugural broadcast of All Things Considered.

In 1995 the CPB informed the station that its audience was so small that its federal funding was in jeopardy, due to new rules in line with the drastically reduced funding for public broadcasting across the United States. Around the same time, the University of Michigan commissioned a private (not public) study that recommended the university divest itself of the radio stations. The university decided against that plan.

Programming history
Donovan Reynolds became the manager of Michigan Radio in 1995. He determined that the only way to save the stations was to execute a marked broadcasting departure from the past with a focus on nationally syndicated programming. Firing all the station's DJs on short notice, including one who had been due to retire in less than a year, Reynolds changed the format to News/Talk on July 1, 1996. Although a few public radio stations had a news/talk format in 1996, most were on AM. Classical music was still offered, but only during evenings, overnight and on weekends.  The classical music programs were phased out in July 2000, but continued to be streamed on the Internet from the station's website until 2004. This was a devastating blow to Ann Arbor's then-thriving classical music community, who were deeply unhappy with the changes, as well as all the people who listened to the other local programming. However, the format has been extremely successful in terms of attracting new listeners and therefore listener donations.

Michigan Radio's transition to a news/talk format coincided with NPR's offering of a new package of talk programs spanning the gap between Morning Edition and All Things Considered. These new programs included The Diane Rehm Show, The Derek McGinty Show, and others, and Michigan Radio was the first station to sign up to offer this package to its listeners.

As one of the first successful news/talk public radio stations on FM, Michigan Radio may have helped influence similarly transitions to that format by stations including WUNC in Chapel Hill, North Carolina, WBUR-FM in Boston, WAMU in Washington, DC, KPCC in Pasadena, California, WHYY-FM in Philadelphia and WBEZ in Chicago. For several years after 1996, Michigan Radio's rise was a case study in the public radio industry, including in Iowa, where the Bornstein and Associates Report on Iowa Public Radio consolidation devotes a chapter to studying Michigan Radio's format change.

Current programming
Michigan Radio provides a variety of programs from NPR and American Public Media. In addition, Michigan Radio broadcasts the BBC World Service as distributed by APM during the late night and early morning hours. In 2012, the station created its daily, locally produced talk show, Stateside, which covers a wide range of Michigan news and policy issues — as well as culture and lifestyle stories. Stateside was originally hosted by Cynthia Canty (Mon-Thu) and Lester Graham (Fri). The current host of Stateside is April Baer.

Local hosts include Doug Tribou (mornings during Morning Edition), Christina Shockley (afternoons during All Things Considered) and Mike Perini (middays).  The news staff includes Steve Carmody, Dustin Dwyer, Lindsey Smith, Kate Wells, Sarah Cwiek, Rebecca Kruth, Tracy Samilton, Sarah Hulett, and news director Vincent Duffy. Michigan Radio produces The Environment Report, sports commentary from John U. Bacon, the latest political happenings in Lansing on It's Just Politics and That's What They Say, a weekend feature from UM English Professor Anne Curzan that explores our changing language and discusses why we say what we say.

In 2018, reporters Kate Wells and Lindsey Smith produced "Believed," a podcast on the Larry Nassar case which went on to win a Peabody Award.

References

Sources
Michigan Radio Newsroom on criminal investigation

External links
"How Radio Got Into the Act" - Jack Mitchell's account of the three men at WUOM who got radio included in the act creating the Corporation for Public Broadcasting.
CPB report "Having it All." The report explores the financial health of public radio stations. (pdf)
Bornstein and Associates Report on Iowa Public Radio, which contains a chapter devoted to Michigan Radio's 1996 format change.
 
 
 
 

American radio networks
NPR member networks
University of Michigan mass media